Palazzo Gavazzi is a Neoclassical palace in Del Monte district, Milan, Italy.

History 
The building was designed by Luigi Clerichetti in 1838 for the wealthy Gavazzi family. The residence was the home of Carlo Cattaneo from 1840 to 1848.

Description 
The building is a typical example of the mansions built during the Restoration period. Each floor bears its own decorations; Doric columns on the ground floor and various pilasters on the first and second floors, rather than the huge decorative works which were popular at the time. The symmetrical facade, covering three levels, is centred on a portal with four Ionic half-columns supporting the first-floor balcony.

References

Palaces in Milan
Houses completed in 1838
Neoclassical architecture in Milan